ADS 48 is a multiple star system in the constellation of Andromeda consisting of 7 stars. The components, in order from A to G, have apparent visual magnitudes of 8.826, 8.995, 13.30, 12.53, 11.68, 9.949, and 13.00.

ADS 48A and ADS 48B are in orbital motion around each other while ADS 48F is a common proper motion companion not gravitationally bound to the pair. The others are unassociated background stars, and component C could be a double star itself. It has also been proposed the existence of an unseen companion of 0.05 .

References

Andromeda (constellation)
M-type main-sequence stars
000428
0004
000038
3
K-type main-sequence stars
Durchmusterung objects
TIC objects